National Public Prosecutor's Office (sometimes also translated as State Prosecutor's Office) is the highest civil organizational unit in Poland's Prosecutor's offices. It's directed by National Public Prosecutor (Prokurator Krajowy). National Public Prosecutor is the second highest prosecutor office in Poland (after Public Prosecutor General).

In 2010 the National Public Prosecutor's Office was replaced by the General Public Prosecutor's Office (Prokuratura Generalna). The title "Public Prosecutor General", however, is still reserved for the one who supervises all other prosecutors (the difference is that he is now elected from independent candidates, and no longer a governmental minister).

In 2016, the National Public Prosecutor's Office was reinstated under the act of January 28, replacing the former General Public Prosecutor's Office. The office of the Public Prosecutor General is again combined with the office of the Polish Minister of Justice, while the National Public Prosecutor is the head of the National Public Prosecutor's Office and acts as the vice Public Prosecutor General.

National Public Prosecutors

References 

Politics of Poland
Law of Poland
Prosecution